Folkestad is a village in Bø municipality, Norway. Its population is 422.

References

Villages in Vestfold og Telemark